Oliver St John of Bletsoe, 1st Baron St John of Bletso (c. 1522 – 21 April 1582) was an English peer.

Personal life 
He was the son of Sir John St John (Bedfordshire MP) (born 1498) of Bletsoe (Bedfordshire) and Spelsbury (Oxfordshire) and his first wife Margaret, the daughter of Sir William Waldegrave. His paternal great-great-great-grandfather Sir Oliver St John of Bletsoe, Spelsbury and Lydiard Tregoze, Wiltshire (d. 1437) was the husband of Margaret Beauchamp of Bletso, great-great-granddaughter of Roger de Beauchamp, who was summoned to Parliament as Baron Beauchamp of Bletso from 1363 to 1379. Since then that title had not been assumed, although St John was considered to be the line of heir. On 13 January 1559 he was raised to the peerage himself as Baron St John of Bletso, in the county of Bedfordshire.

Career
He served in the household of Prince Edward and on his master's accession as Edward VI in 1547, he entered the royal household. He was elected as knight of the shire (MP) for Bedfordshire in 1547. He served as High Sheriff of Bedfordshire and Buckinghamshire in 1551, and from 1560 to 1569 was Lord Lieutenant of Bedfordshire.

The offices he held during his career included:
 Gentleman waiter extraordinary, household of Prince Edward by 1547
 Gentleman waiter extraordinary, royal household 1547
 Commissioner, relief, Bedfordshire 1550
 Commissioner, musters 1560
 Commissioner, ecclesiastical causes, dioceses of Lincoln and Peterborough 1571, 1575
 High Sheriff of Bedfordshire and Buckinghamshire 1551–1552
 Justice of the Peace, Bedfordshire 1 554–1558, q. 1558/59–1582, Cambridgeshire, Huntingdonshire 1562–1582
 Custos rotulorum, Bedfordshire 1558/59
 Lord Lieutenant, Bedfordshire 1569

Marriages and issue
Lord St John of Bletso married twice. He married firstly, before 8 February 1542, Agnes, the daughter of Sir John Fisher, and by her had four sons and six daughters:
 John St John, 2nd Baron St John of Bletso
 Oliver St John, 3rd Baron St John of Bletso
 Thomas St John, of Thurley, Bedfordshire (inherited when St. John of Thurley became extinct; Thomas St. John of Thurley was named as brother to Judith St. John Pelham), who married Anne Bourne, widow of Thomas Chicheley and daughter of Sir John Bourne. Thomas St. John was buried 27 Dec 1621. Had at least two children: Oliver St. John and Anne St. John. He also had several step-children. 
 Francis St John
 Martha St John, who married firstly, John Cheney and secondly, James Colbrond
 Judith St John, who married Sir John Pelham
 Margaret St John, who married Nicholas Luke
 Anne St John, who married firstly, Robert Corbet. After his death in 1583, she married Sir Robert Lytton.
 Margery St John
 Agnes St John
He married, before 28 August 1572, Elizabeth, the daughter of Geoffrey Chamber, and widow of Sir Walter Stonor (died 1551), Reginald Conyers (died 1560) and Edward Griffin (died 1569).

Death
He died on 21 April 1582 and was succeeded in the barony by his eldest son John.

Notes

References

External links

 
 Oliver St. John, Baron St. John of Bletso – family tree at familysearch.org, archived in 2014
 

1582 deaths
Peers of England created by Elizabeth I
High Sheriffs of Bedfordshire
High Sheriffs of Buckinghamshire
English MPs 1547–1552
Lord-Lieutenants of Bedfordshire
Oliver
1522 births
16th-century English nobility
People from the Borough of Bedford
Barons St John of Bletso